Kurijan (also Romanized as Kūrījān and Koorījan; also known as Khur-ī-Jānī) is a village in Sabzdasht Rural District, in the Central District of Kabudarahang County, Hamadan Province, Iran. At the 2006 census, its population was 2,479, in 630 families.

References 

Populated places in Kabudarahang County